The Mother Goose Award was an award annually presented to "the most exciting newcomer to British children's book illustration."

It was inaugurated in 1979 and last awarded in 1999. Sponsored by Books for Children booksellers, award winners received £1,000 and a gilded goose egg.

Winners

Twenty illustrators were recognised in 21 years.

Primary sources
Records of the Mother Goose Award from 1978 to 1986 are held in the archives of the Institute of Education, University of London.

See also

 Kate Greenaway Medal 
 Kurt Maschler Award 
 Gelett Burgess Children's Book Award

References

British children's literary awards
Illustrated book awards
Awards established in 1979
1979 establishments in the United Kingdom
Awards disestablished in 1999
1999 disestablishments in the United Kingdom